Marion Carll Farm is a historic home and property located in Commack, Suffolk County, New York. It consists of the 1860 farmhouse, privy, garage, smokehouse, milk house, horse barn/carriage house, sheep barn, and four smaller barns. It was added to the National Register of Historic Places in 1979.

Marion Carll was a schoolteacher who moved onto the property in 1885. She also served as Commack's District's Treasurer and Census Taker.

When Marion Carll died in 1968, she willed to the Commack School District to be used as a historical museum for educational purposes. However, the property was not maintained and fell into disrepair. In 2012, several of Carll's heirs filed a lawsuit to have the farm returned to them due to the lack of maintenance and state of disrepair of the property. However, this lawsuit was dismissed in 2017.

In 2019, the Commack School District announced that they would be leasing part of the farm to Long Island University for a veterinary school and that it would be using the funding from the lease to restore the farm. Despite this announcement, some local activists remain unconvinced that enough funding will be raised to be able to accomplish a proper restoration. Long Island University signed a 10-year lease and intends to raise grazing animals on 6 acres of the property for students to practice clinical skills on.

Established in 1701 - Marion Carll Farm, Commack, NY includes an 1860 mansion that has been allowed to decay over the last ten years to its current deplorable condition. Marion Carll, whose ancestors owned the property for almost 300 years, willed the property to Commack Public Schools. Beyond a tarp placed on its roof, there have been no other efforts made to protect this historic treasure from the elements for ten years. Currently the farm is being leased to a university, also without any provisions in place to diminish its continued deterioration. Ms. Carll generously left this property to the residents of Commack in care of a neglectful benefactor. 

A sign has been placed on the property earlier this year calling it 'COMMACK SCHOOL DISTRICT AGRICULTURAL & HISTORICAL CENTER" replacing what has been known with signage as "MARION CARLL FARM" for almost 100 years.

References

A sign has been placed on the property earlier this year calling it 'COMMACK SCHOOL DISTRICT AGRICULTURAL & HISTORICAL CENTER" replacing what has been known with signage as "MARION CARLL FARM" for almost 100 years.

External links
Style our Life blog post with detailed photos and history

Houses on the National Register of Historic Places in New York (state)
Federal architecture in New York (state)
Italianate architecture in New York (state)
Houses in Suffolk County, New York
National Register of Historic Places in Suffolk County, New York